Viviana Chinchilla Ramón (born 21 December 1994) is a Costa Rican footballer who plays as a midfielder for Liga Deportiva Alajuelense and the Costa Rica women's national team.

International career
Chinchilla represented Costa Rica at the 2014 FIFA U-20 Women's World Cup. At senior level, she played the 2014 Central American and Caribbean Games.

References

1994 births
Living people
Women's association football midfielders
Costa Rican women's footballers
Costa Rica women's international footballers
Central American and Caribbean Games bronze medalists for Costa Rica
Competitors at the 2014 Central American and Caribbean Games
Central American and Caribbean Games medalists in football